Rulien Township is a township in Lake of the Woods County, Minnesota United States. As of the 2000 census, the township had a total population of three.

Geography
According to the United States Census Bureau, the township has a total surface area of 36.5 square miles (94.4 km), of which 36.4 square miles (94.3 km) is land and 0.04 square mile (0.1 km) is water. The total area is 0.08% water.

Demographics
As of the census of 2000, there were three people, one household, and one family residing in the township. The population density was 0.1 people per square mile (0.0/km). There were six housing units at an average density of 0.2/sq mi (0.1/km). All residents were white.

There was one household, a married couple, both aged twenty-five to forty-four, with a son under 18. The median age was forty one years. The father had the sole income of $28,750.

References

Townships in Lake of the Woods County, Minnesota
Townships in Minnesota